Vicken Parsons, Lady Gormley (born 1957), is a British artist, mostly painting in oils, but also making sculptures. Her works are displayed in Tate Britain, and are in the collections of the Arts Council and the Scottish National Gallery of Modern Art.

Life 
She attended the Slade School of Fine Art, in London.

Exhibitions 

Parsons' solo exhibitions have included Galerie Christine König (Vienna), Kettle's Yard, the Alan Cristea Gallery, and Tate St Ives. Her work has also been exhibited at the Royal Academy, the Institute of Contemporary Arts, Tate Modern, Southampton City Art Gallery and Kunsthalle Mannheim.

Personal life 

Her husband is sculptor Sir Antony Gormley. Vicken met Gormley while attending the Slade, and they married in 1980. She also worked as his assistant. Gormley said of her:

The couple have three children, a daughter and two sons.

References

External links 
 

1957 births
Living people
20th-century British painters
Alumni of the Slade School of Fine Art
20th-century British sculptors
21st-century British sculptors
21st-century British painters
20th-century British women artists
21st-century British women artists
Wives of knights